John "Cockey" Glover was a 35-year-old African-American man who was lynched in Holton in Bibb County, Georgia by a mob of 300 white men on August 2, 1922. According to the United States Senate Committee on the Judiciary it was the 43rd of 61 lynchings during 1922 in the United States.

Three John Glovers

In 1922 three men named John Glover died or were killed. On February 17, 1922, a worker of the Shelton turpentine still which used the Peonage debt system to keep their workers, John Glover was killed after committing "one of the first mass school shootings". Five months later John Glover, a white Confederate veteran who was one of the wealthiest citizens in Rome, Georgia died of natural causes. Finally, in August 1922 John "Cockey" Glover was lynched by a mob after allegedly taking part in the shooting of "particularly brutal White sheriff’s deputy" Walter C. Byrd.

Background
Six feet, five inches tall Deputy Sheriff Walter C. Byrd started working at the local prison but he was so brutal to its inmates that he was transferred to the Sheriff's department. There he developed a reputation for racial brutality. Just after 6:00 PM on July 29, 1922, Byrd entered Hatfield's Pool Hall on Hollywood Avenue in Macon. The pool hall was owned by Charles Henry Douglass, the wealthiest Black man in Macon. In Hatfield a scuffle broke out and claiming self-defense Glovers shot Walter C. Byrd. Another deputy there, Romas Raley, shot and killed George Marshall and mortally wounded Samuel Brooks, two Black men who happened to be playing pool.

Glover was able to escape but the police shut down the city stopping all trains and released a bulletin that read: "John (Cocky) Glover, aged 25, 5 feet 6 or 7inches in height; light mulatto; right eye cocked; wears gray striped pitch-black suit of clothes; clean shaven; neat dresser. Reward of $300 [$ in ] will be paid by the sheriff of Bibb county for his apprehension."

The day after the shooting, Glover was still on the run and Macon police began door-to-door warrantless searches of houses in the Black Macon neighborhoods of Pleasant Hill, Tindall Field, Unionville, and other Black majority areas. In Griffin, Georgia police officers T.F. Phelps and Jim Huckabee found and arrested Glover on a train as he tried to flee to Chicago. Word of his arrest quickly reached Macon and a white mob of some 300 people drove to Griffin in hopes of lynching Glover. Police tried to secretly return Glover to Macon but they were intercepted by the mob on the road,  from Holton in Bibb County, Georgia.  
 
Glover was tied to a tree, riddled with bullets and lit on fire. The mob then took the mutilated body and paraded it through the Black areas of Macon, even trying to display it in C.H. Douglass's theatre. Police finally seized the body but didn't move it from the curb outside the theatre. Thousands of Macon residents came to view the body, some even fighting to grab a souvenir from the corpse.

National memorial 

The National Memorial for Peace and Justice opened in Montgomery, Alabama, on April 26, 2018. Featured among other things is the Memorial Corridor which displays 805 hanging steel rectangles, each representing the counties in the United States where a documented lynching took place and, for each county, the names of those lynched. The memorial hopes that communities, like Macon–Bibb County where John Glover was lynched, will take these slabs and install them in their own communities.

See also 
List of lynching victims in the United States

Bibliography  
Notes

References

1922 deaths
1922 in Georgia (U.S. state)
1922 murders in the United States
African-American history between emancipation and the civil rights movement
African-American history of Georgia (U.S. state)
American murder victims
Anti-black racism in the United States
August 1922 events
Bibb County, Georgia
Crimes in Georgia (U.S. state)
Deaths by person in Georgia (U.S. state)
History of racism in Georgia (U.S. state)
Lynching deaths in Georgia (U.S. state)
Murdered African-American people
People murdered in Georgia (U.S. state)
Prisoners murdered in custody
Racially motivated violence against African Americans
White American riots in the United States